Auzouville-Auberbosc is a former commune  in the Seine-Maritime department in the Normandy region in northern France. On 1 January 2017, it was merged into the new commune Terres-de-Caux.

Geography
The A29 autoroute passes by in the southern part of the commune

Population

Places of interest
 The church of St.Leger at Auzouville, dating from the sixteenth century.
 The church of St.Leger at Auberbosc, dating from the eleventh century.
 A medieval manorhouse.

See also
Communes of the Seine-Maritime department

References

Former communes of Seine-Maritime